Since France's first international association football match in 1904, there have been 25 occasions when a French player has scored three or more goals (a hat-trick) in a game. The first hat-trick was scored by Eugène Maës against Italy in 1912. The record for the most goals scored in an international by a French player is five, which has been achieved on two occasions: by Maës against Luxembourg in 1913, and by Thadée Cisowski against Belgium in 1956.

Just Fontaine holds the record for the most hat-tricks scored by a French player, with five between 1953 and 1959. Two of these came at the 1958 World Cup finals, when France finished in third place. Fontaine remains the only French player to have scored a hat-trick at the World Cup finals. In the 1984 European Championships, Michel Platini scored hat-tricks in consecutive first-round matches, against Belgium and Yugoslavia. The last French player to score a hat-trick was Kylian Mbappé, who scored three times against Argentina in the 2022 FIFA World Cup Final.

France have conceded 41 hat-tricks in their history, 31 of which came before the Second World War. In the post-war period, the only player to have scored two hat-tricks against France is Pelé; the first of these occurred in the 1958 World Cup semi-finals. Pelé is also the only non-European player to have scored a hat-trick against France. The Danish forward Sophus Nielsen holds the record for the most goals scored against France in a match, with ten in a 17–1 win at the 1908 Olympic Games in London. England's Geoff Hurst scored the last hat-trick scored against France, in a friendly in 1969.

Hat-tricks for France

Hat-tricks conceded by France

References

France
Association football player non-biographical articles
Hat-tricks